Mpemba is an African name that may refer to
Mpemba Kasi, a 14th Bantu kingdom in the Kingdom of Kongo 
Erasto B. Mpemba (born 1950), Tanzanian game warden who discovered the Mpemba effect in water
Parisel Mpemba (born 1978), team handball player from the Democratic Republic of the Congo